Los Angeles earthquake could refer to:

1933 Long Beach earthquake
1952 Kern County earthquake
1971 San Fernando earthquake
1987 Whittier Narrows earthquake
1991 Sierra Madre earthquake
1992 Landers earthquake
1994 Northridge earthquake
2008 Chino Hills earthquake

See also
List of earthquakes in California